Samuel Breck (February 25, 1834 – February 23, 1918) was an officer in the United States Army who served as Adjutant General of the U.S. Army from 1897 to 1898.

Early career
Born in Middleborough, Massachusetts to one of the oldest families in the state, Breck entered the United States Military Academy at West Point on  July 1, 1851. He graduated seventh in his class on July 1, 1855 and was commissioned second lieutenant of artillery. While with the 1st Artillery, he served in Florida during the Third Seminole War.

Breck served at several forts along both the Atlantic and Gulf coasts from 1856 to 1860. From 1856 into 1857 he was at the garrison at Fort Moultrie in South Carolina. He served at Fort McHenry in Maryland from 1857 to 1859. In 1859 he marched from Helena, Arkansas to Fort Clark, Texas. Later in 1859 into 1860, he was again in the garrison at Fort Moultrie, South Carolina.

At Auburndale, Massachusetts on September 23, 1857, Breck married Caroline Juliet Barrett (b. May 18, 1832), daughter of Samuel and Anne Juliet (Eddy) Barrett. They had two children: Amelia, born August 25, 1860 at Fort Moultrie, South Carolina, died in infancy; and, Samuel, born August 8, 1862 in Washington, D.C., who became a practicing physician in Boston.

From September 24, 1860 to April 26, 1861 Breck served at West Point as Assistant Professor of Geography, History and Ethics. From April 26 to December 3, 1861, he was Principal Assistant Professor of Geography, History, and Ethics, during which time he was a first lieutenant with the 1st Artillery from April 11, 1861 to February 20, 1862. Breck was promoted to captain on November 19, 1861.

Civil War
On November 29, 1861 Breck became staff captain—assistant adjutant general of General Irvin McDowell's division of the Army of the Potomac, which defended Washington, D.C during the American Civil War or, as it was characterized at the time by the Union, "the Rebellion of the Seceding States."

On March 24, 1862 Breck became assistant adjutant general of the 1st Army Corps. From April 4 to June 20, 1862 he was assistant adjutant general of the Department of the Rappahannock. On April 18, 1862 he was engaged in the occupation of Falmouth, Virginia on the north side of the Rappahannock River opposite Fredericksburg, Virginia He was commissioned major, additional aide-de-camp on May 23, 1862. In late May and early June, he was part of Union Brigadier General Irvin McDowell's unsuccessful expedition to the Shenandoah Valley to intercept the Confederate forces under General Stonewall Jackson and cut off their avenue of retreat from Winchester, Virginia.

On July 2, 1862, Breck took the post of assistant in the adjutant general's office in Washington, which he held until the end of the war.  He was in charge of "Rolls, Returns, Books, Blanks and business pertaining to the enlisted men of the Regular and Volunteer Forces, and of the records of discontinued commands and the preparation and publication of the 'Volunteer Army Register.'"

Samuel was successively brevetted lieutenant colonel (September 24, 1864), colonel (March 13, 1865) and brigadier general (appointed March 8, 1866 and confirmed May 4, 1866 to rank from March 13, 1865 "for diligent, faithful and meritorious service in the adjutant general's department during the rebellion").

Later career
Breck remained in the Adjutant General's Department following the end of the war. From 1879, he served in California, New York, Washington, D. C., and Minnesota. From 1885 he served as adjutant general for various departments, including the Department of the Platte, Omaha, Nebraska and the Department of Dakota. He was promoted to lieutenant colonel assistant adjutant general February 28, 1887.

In August 1893 he returned to the Adjutant General's Department in Washington as a colonel, and on September 11, 1897, was elevated by President William McKinley and Secretary of War Russell Alger to Adjutant General of the U. S. Army with the rank of brigadier general. He retired in February 1898, and died in February 1918 in Brookline, Massachusetts.

See also

List of Massachusetts generals in the American Civil War
Massachusetts in the American Civil War

Notes

References
Eicher, John H. and Eicher, David J., Civil War High Commands. Stanford University Press, Stanford, California, 2001. .
Long, E.B., The Civil War Day by Day, p. 201. Doubleday & Company, Garden City, New York, 1971. Library of Congress Catalog Card Number 73-163653.

1834 births
1918 deaths
People from Brookline, Massachusetts
People from Middleborough, Massachusetts
Adjutants general of the United States Army
People of Massachusetts in the American Civil War
American people of the Seminole Wars
Union Army officers
United States Army generals
United States Military Academy alumni